Jay Lewis (1914–1969) was a British film director and writer.

Jay Lewis may also refer to:

Jay Lewis, former guitarist of The La's and current bassist of Cast
Jay Lewis House
Jay Lewis (motorcycle racer) in 2009 British 125 Championship season

See also
Matthew Jay Lewis, British actor
Jason Lewis (disambiguation)